Graphosia stenopepla is a moth of the family Erebidae. It was described by George Hampson in 1914. It is found in Australia.

References

 

Lithosiina
Moths described in 1914